Evitts Mountain is a stratigraphic ridge in the Ridge and Valley region of the Appalachian Mountains, located in Bedford County, Pennsylvania, and Allegany County, Maryland.

Geography
The ridge line runs north from Rocky Gap State Park in Maryland, across the Mason–Dixon line into Pennsylvania and then to the west Martin Hill, passing very near Tussey Mountain in Snake Spring Valley.  The ridge then turns west, wrapping around north of Bedford, Pennsylvania to its intersection with Dunning Mountain, dividing Dunning Cove from Morrison Cove. The Raystown Branch Juniata River passes through "The Narrows", a prominent water gap along with the Pennsylvania Turnpike and the now dismantled Bedford and Bridgeport Railroad near Bedford, Pennsylvania. Evitts Creek runs through the base of the Mountain in Rocky Gap State Park.

Etymology
The mountain is named in honor of an early pioneer in Allegany County, Maryland, and Bedford County, Pennsylvania, thought by some to have gone by the last name of "Evart" (Evett, Evert, and Evit have also been proposed). At the top of the  mountain lies what its allegedly Mr. Evart's old homestead, from which he would return by the same route every day hiking a steep  trail, now called Evitts Trail. (At least one reference has Evitt dying before 1749.)

Geology 
See: Geology of Bedford County, Pennsylvania

References

 

Landforms of Allegany County, Maryland
Ridges of Maryland
Ridges of Pennsylvania
Ridges of Bedford County, Pennsylvania
Water gaps of Pennsylvania
Valleys of Maryland